Gustavo Kuerten defeated Sergi Bruguera in the final, 6–3, 6–4, 6–2 to win the men's singles tennis title at the 1997 French Open. He became the first unseeded player since Mats Wilander in 1982 and the second-lowest ranked player ever to win a major, and the first Brazilian male singles player to win a major. Following the win, Kuerten improved in the rankings from world No. 66 to No. 15.

Yevgeny Kafelnikov was the defending champion, but lost to Kuerten in the quarterfinals.

Seeds

Qualifying

Draw

Finals

Top half

Section 1

Section 2

Section 3

Section 4

Bottom half

Section 5

Section 6

Section 7

Section 8

External links
 1997 French Open Men's Singles draw – Association of Tennis Professionals (ATP)
 1997 French Open – Men's draws and results at the International Tennis Federation

Men's Singles
French Open by year – Men's singles
1997 ATP Tour